The 1986 Virginia Slims World Championship Series  was the 14th season since the foundation of the Women's Tennis Association. It commenced on March 24, 1986, and concluded in December, 1986 after 41 events. The season was abbreviated in order to return the tour to a calendar year basis.

The Virginia Slims World Championship Series was the elite tour for professional women's tennis organised by the Women's Tennis Association (WTA). It was held in place of the WTA Tour from 1983 until 1987 and featured tournaments that had previously been part of the Toyota Series and the Avon Series. It included the four Grand Slam tournaments and a series of other events. ITF tournaments were not part of the tour, although they awarded points for the WTA World Ranking. No Australian Open was held during 1986 due to the tournament start date being moved from November to January.

Schedule
The table below shows the 1986 Virginia Slims World Championship Series schedule.

March

April

May

June

July

August

September

October

November

Statistical Information

Titles won by player
These tables present the number of singles (S), doubles (D), and mixed doubles (X) titles won by each player and each nation during the season, within all the tournament categories of the 1986 Virginia Slims World Championship Series: the Grand Slam tournaments, the Year-end championships and regular events. The players/nations are sorted by:

 total number of titles (a doubles title won by two players representing the same nation counts as only one win for the nation);
 highest amount of highest category tournaments (for example, having a single Grand Slam gives preference over any kind of combination without a Grand Slam title); 
 a singles > doubles > mixed doubles hierarchy; 
 alphabetical order (by family names for players).

Titles won by nation

Rankings
Below are the 1986 WTA year-end rankings (December 21, 1986) in both singles and doubles competition:

See also
 1986 Nabisco Grand Prix
 Women's Tennis Association
 International Tennis Federation

References

External links
Official WTA Tour website

 
Virginia Slims World Championship Series
1986 WTA Tour